The Tichnor Rice Dryer and Storage Building is a historic rice processing facility at 1030 Arkansas Highway 44 in Tichnor, Arkansas.  It is an L-shaped structure, four stories in height, and rests on a concrete pad that is open to truck access on its north, east, southeast, and northwest elevations.  It is sided in corrugated metal and has a metal gable roof.  Built in 1955-56 for Woodrow Turner, it is the largest building in the small community, and remains an important facility for local rice growers to dry their crop.

The facility was listed on the National Register of Historic Places in 2006.

See also 
 A.M. Bohnert Rice Plantation Pump also in Arkansas County, Arkansas
 National Register of Historic Places listings in Arkansas County, Arkansas

References

Agricultural buildings and structures on the National Register of Historic Places in Arkansas
Rice production in the United States
Industrial buildings completed in 1956
Industrial buildings and structures on the National Register of Historic Places in Arkansas
National Register of Historic Places in Arkansas County, Arkansas
1956 establishments in Arkansas